I Am the Resurrection: A Tribute to John Fahey is a tribute album to guitarist John Fahey released in 2006.  The album's title is taken from the title of the third track of his album The Transfiguration of Blind Joe Death.

History
Co-produced by Stephen Brower and M. Ward, I Am the Resurrection was the first John Fahey tribute album released after his death. Brower related, "We wanted to go after people who we thought wouldn't do traditional renderings of his stuff."

Reception

I Am the Resurrection received mixed reviews upon its release, although most were favorable or equivocal.  In his Allmusic review, critic Alex Henderson noted the "interesting thing about this Fahey tribute compilation is the fact that it isn't dominated by fingerpickers and Fahey disciples." and "this compilation wasn't assembled with purists in mind." He called the disc a bit uneven but it "is full of pleasant surprises and is a memorable demonstration of the fact that Fahey's compositions can be useful well beyond the fingerpicker field."

Erik Davis of Blender  gave the tribute album five of five stars and stated "For once, the motley character of most tribute records fits the subject." John Metzger of The Music Box felt "there’s nothing on I Am the Resurrection that is anywhere near as groundbreaking or strange as Fahey’s own recordings. Yet, what the performers accomplish is still strikingly potent." Steve Horowitz praised the album, writing it is "hard to resist pushing the replay button and listening to [each song] again before going on to the next song. That’s true of every tune on this disc, which is a fine tribute to one of America’s most remarkable artists."

In his review for Pitchfork Media, Matthew Murphy praised some artist's appearances while noting less success for others. Murphy called Sufjan Stevens contribution "typically fussy" and an "ill match for the contours" of Fahey's music and M. Ward's rendition "falls completely flat." Equally mixed was Andrew Gerig's review for Stylus magazine that "the tribute disc is only for Fahey diehards" and that too many of the artists "hold back."

In his review of The Great Koonaklaster Speaks: A John Fahey Celebration, Grayson Currin called I Am the Resurrection "the first... and the biggest failure" of the Fahey tribute albums... to think that I Am the Resurrection's alternately self-involved (Stevens) or irreverently unimaginative (Peter Case) interpretations gave newcomers invalid impressions of Fahey's catalogue is, really, a bit frightening."

Track listing
All songs by John Fahey unless otherwise noted.

Personnel
Joey Burns – vocals, guitar, upright bass
Sufjan Stevens – vocals, acoustic guitar, electric guitar, banjo, flute, recorder, oboe, drums, shaker, triangle, percussion
Kevin Barker – vocals, electric guitar, recorder, percussion
David Immerglück – guitar
Jack Rose – guitar
Lee Ranaldo – guitar
M. Ward – guitar
Glenn Jones – guitar
Bruce Kaphan – lap steel guitar
Mike Gangloff – banjo
John Convertino – marimba, drums
Otto Hauser – drums, percussion
Michael Knobloch – drums
John Hanes – drums
Robin Amos – electronics
Rosie Thomas – background vocals
Production notes:
Jim Waters – mixing
Kevin Nettleingham – mastering
Stephen Brower – liner notes
Glenn Jones – liner notes
Kevin Barker – liner notes
Zak Riles – photography

References

2006 compilation albums
John Fahey (musician) tribute albums
Vanguard Records compilation albums
Alternative rock compilation albums